HL-2A (Huan-Liuqi-2A) is a medium-sized tokamak for fusion research in Chengdu, China. It was constructed by the China National Nuclear Corporation from early 1999 to 2002, based on the main components (magnet coils and plasma vessel) of the former German ASDEX device. HL-2A was the first tokamak with a divertor in China. The research goals of HL-2A are the study of fundamental fusion plasma physics to support the international ITER fusion reactor.

References

Tokamaks
Fusion reactors